is a Japanese retired professional wrestler best known for his time in the Japanese promotions DDT Pro Wrestling and Pro Wrestling Freedoms.

Professional wrestling career

Independent circuit (2013–2017)
Suzuki made his professional wrestling debut at a house show promoted by Ryukyu Dragon Pro Wrestling on December 1, 2013, as Superman Taro where he teamed up with Churaumi Saver and Tida Heat in a losing effort to Fuma, Gurukun Mask and RyuKyu-Dog Dingo as a result of a six-man tag team match.

DDT Pro-Wrestling (2014–2017)
Suzuki is best known for his tenure with DDT Pro Wrestling. At DDT agePa!! 2015 on September 5, he won a 13-man reverse battle royal also involving Akito, Shunma Katsumata, Shigehiro Irie, Kazusada Higuchi, Makoto Oishi and others. At DDT Osaka Octopus 2016 on December 4, he competed in a gauntlet battle royal for the Ironman Heavymetalweight Championship also involving Kazuki Hirata, Kikutaro, Mad Paulie, Masahiro Takanashi, Toru Owashi and others.

He competed in various of the promotion's signature events such as DDT Peter Pan, making his only appearance at Ryōgoku Peter Pan 2017 on August 20 where he fell short to Gota Ihashi in a Casual Street Pro-Wrestling Extra Edition! match for the King of Dark Championship. As for the DDT Judgement series of events, he made his first appearance at Judgement 2016: DDT 19th Anniversary on March 21 where he teamed up with DJ Nira to defeat Seiya Morohashi and Hoshitango in a tag team match for the King of Dark Championship but without winning the title. His last match occurred at Judgement 2017: DDT 20th Anniversary on March 20 where he teamed up with Nobuhiro Shimatani and Naomi Yoshimura to defeat Rekka, Daiki Shimomura and Yuki Ueno.

On November 12, 2017, DDT announced via Twitter that Suzuki decided to retire from professional wrestling to focus on his social welfare career. Suzuki had his retirement match at DDT DNA 39 on December 13, 2017, a three-on-one handicap match in which he unsuccessfully took on Ken Ohka, Ryota Nakatsu and Kota Umeda.

Personal life
His brother Shin Suzuki is also a professional wrestler in the Japanese independent scene.

Championships and accomplishments
DDT Pro-Wrestling
King of Dark Championship (2 times)
Ironman Heavymetalweight Championship (1 time)
Wrestling Koshien Qualifying Tournament (2017)

External links

References 

1990 births
Living people
Japanese male professional wrestlers
People from Tochigi Prefecture
21st-century professional wrestlers
Ironman Heavymetalweight Champions
King of Dark Champions